Piet Bergveld (born 26 January 1940) is a Dutch electrical engineer. He was professor of biosensors at the University of Twente between 1983 and 2003. He is the inventor of the ion-sensitive field-effect transistor (ISFET) sensor. Bergveld's work has focused on electrical engineering and biomedical technology.

Career
Bergveld was born in Oosterwolde, Friesland on 26 January 1940. In 1960 he started studying electrical engineering at the Eindhoven University of Technology, he had preferred to study biomedical engineering but that was not available. Between 1964 and 1965 he did a master's degree at the Philips Natuurkundig Laboratorium. In the latter half of the 1960s Bergveld started working as a scientific employee at the Technische Hogeschool Twente (which later became the University of Twente). Intrigued by discovering and measuring the origin of electronic activity in the human brain Bergveld started working on a new technique. In 1970, he completed the development of the ion-sensitive field-effect transistor (ISFET) sensor. It was based on his earlier research on the MOSFET (metal–oxide–semiconductor field-effect transistor), which he realized could be adapted into a biosensor for electrochemical and biological applications. In 1973, he earned his PhD at Twente, with a dissertation which delved deeper into the possibilities of ISFET sensors.

Bergveld worked at the University of Twente from 1965 until he took up emeritus status in February 2003. He had been a full professor since 1983. At the university he was one of the driving forces for increased biomedical technology research and one of the founding fathers of the MESA+ research institute.

In 1995 Bergveld was awarded the  prize by minister Hans Wijers. He was elected a member of the Royal Netherlands Academy of Arts and Sciences in 1997. In April 2003 Bergveld was made a Knight in the Order of the Netherlands Lion.

See also
 ISFET (Ion-sensitive field-effect transistor)
 ChemFET (Chemical field-effect transistor)
 BioFET (Biosensor field-effect transistor)

References

External links
 Profile on IEEE Xplore

1940 births
Biosensors
Dutch electrical engineers
Eindhoven University of Technology alumni
Knights of the Order of the Netherlands Lion
Living people
Members of the Royal Netherlands Academy of Arts and Sciences
People from Ooststellingwerf
University of Twente alumni
Academic staff of the University of Twente
20th-century Dutch people